Southwestern Lombard is a group of dialects of Western Lombard language spoken in the provinces of Pavia, Lodi, Novara, Cremona, in the south of the historic Insubria, and comprises Pavese dialect, Ludesan dialect, Nuaresat dialect, Cremunéez dialect and others.

Bibliography 
 

Western Lombard language